Gongola State is a former administrative division of Nigeria. It was created on 3 February 1976 from the Adamawa and Sardauna Provinces of North State, together with the Wukari Division of the then Benue-Plateau State; it existed until 27 August 1991, when it was divided into two states - Adamawa and Taraba. The city of Yola was the capital of Gongola State.

Gongola State was governed by an Executive Council.

And it was recall to be most peaceful state to live in north, with lowest crime rate among other state of the federation In 1980.

References 

Former Nigerian administrative divisions
States and territories established in 1976
Library of Congress Africa Collection related
Gongola State
States of Nigeria